Vaghatin is a village in the Sisian Municipality of the Syunik Province in Armenia. The Vorotnavank monastery is located close to Vaghatin.

Demographics 
The Statistical Committee of Armenia reported its population was 756 in 2010, up from 631 at the 2001 census.

References 

Populated places in Syunik Province